The Paraná Valles are a set of channels in a valley in the Margaritifer Sinus quadrangle (MC-19) region of Mars, located at approximately 23.1° South and 10.2° West. They are 350 km long and were named after an ancient and modern name for a South American river (Brazil, Argentina).  A low area between the Paraná Valles and Loire Valles is believed to have once held a lake.

References

See also

 Geology of Mars
 HiRISE
 HiWish program
 Lakes on Mars
 Vallis (planetary geology)
 Water on Mars

Valleys and canyons on Mars
Margaritifer Sinus quadrangle